"Will Anatole Return to Brinkley Court?" is the fifth episode of the first series of the 1990s British comedy television series Jeeves and Wooster. It is also called "Brinkley Manor" or "The Matchmaker". The episode aired in the US on 9 December 1990 on Masterpiece Theatre.

Background 
Adapted from Right Ho, Jeeves.

Cast
 Bertie Wooster – Hugh Laurie
 Jeeves – Stephen Fry
 Aunt Dahlia – Brenda Bruce
 Tom Travers – Ralph Michael
 Angela Travers – Amanda Elwes
 Madeline Bassett – Francesca Folan
 Tuppy Glossop – Robert Daws
 Gussie Fink-Nottle – Richard Garnett
 Barmy Fotheringay-Phipps – Adam Blackwood
 Oofy Prosser – Richard Dixon
 Anatole – John Barrard
 Headmaster – Peter Hughes
 Seppings – Neil Hallett

Plot
Anatole was the supremely skilled French chef of Aunt Dahlia at her country house Brinkley Court. He gave notice when Bertie recommended that they make a hunger strike in order to provoke feelings of guilt in others and to go without dinner made by the chef. Jeeves returns to London to persuade Anatole to return to Brinkley Court, whereto Bertie subsequently goes to reconcile Angela Travers with Tuppy Glossop, who is growing increasingly suspicious and jealous of his relationship with her.

In order to bolster Gussie Fink-Nottle's courage to deliver the prizes and propose to Madeline Bassett, both Bertie and Jeeves spike his orange juice. Jeeves finally sorts out all the fractured relationships with a plan to set off the fire alarm.

See also
 List of Jeeves and Wooster characters

References

External links

Jeeves and Wooster episodes
1990 British television episodes